Marie Cinq-Mars was borough mayor of Outremont from 2007 to 2017. She is a former member of the Union Montreal municipal political party.

Cinq-Mars was first elected as a city councillor with the former city of Outremont in 1999. Following Outremont's merger with Montreal, she was then elected as a city councillor representing the borough of Outremont in 2002. She sat on the city of Montreal's executive committee where she was responsible for the portfolios of culture, heritage, design and the status of women.

Cinq-Mars holds a degree in Communications from Concordia University and in Arts from the Université du Québec à Montréal. She is a professional artist and was a teacher until 2007.

References

Montreal city councillors
Living people
Mayors of places in Quebec
Concordia University alumni
Université du Québec à Montréal alumni
Women mayors of places in Quebec
People from Outremont, Quebec
Women municipal councillors in Canada
21st-century Canadian politicians
21st-century Canadian women politicians
Year of birth missing (living people)